Peter Arnautoff (born December 29, 1951) was an American soccer goalkeeper who played professionally in the North American Soccer League and Major Indoor Soccer League.

Arnautoff was born in Oakland, California and attended the University of San Francisco where he played on the men's soccer team from 1975 to 1978.  He won the 1975, 1976 and 1978 NCAA Men's Division I Soccer Championship with the Dons.  In the 1976 tournament, he posted shutouts in each game.  Arnautoff was subsequently inducted into the USF Hall of Fame and has been named a USF Legend of the Hilltop. In 1979, he signed with the Edmonton Drillers of the North American Soccer League.  He then played the 1980 season with the Philadelphia Fury.  He also played two seasons with the Philadelphia Fever of the Major Indoor Soccer League.  He was a member of the San Francisco Fire Department.

Arnautoff was selected for the 1980 U.S. Olympic team, but did not get to play any games due to the United States boycott of the 1980 Moscow Games. The Moscow Games were the first to be held in Eastern Europe and were boycotted by the US and a number of other countries in reaction to the Soviet invasion in Afghanistan the year prior.

Victor Arnautoff, Russian-American painter and professor of art, is Peter's grandfather.

References

American soccer players
American expatriate soccer players
American expatriate sportspeople in Canada
American people of Russian descent
North American Soccer League (1968–1984) players
Association football goalkeepers
Edmonton Drillers (1979–1982) players
Expatriate soccer players in Canada
Major Indoor Soccer League (1978–1992) players
NCAA Division I Men's Soccer Tournament Most Outstanding Player winners
Philadelphia Fever (MISL) players
Philadelphia Fury (1978–1980) players
San Francisco Dons men's soccer players
Sportspeople from Oakland, California
Soccer players from California
1951 births
Living people

https://usfdons.com/sports/2012/8/7/Olympians.aspx